Poteryayevka is a rural locality (a settlement) in Mamontovsky District, Altai Krai, Russia. The population was 33 as of 2013. There are 9 streets.

Geography 
Poteryayevka is located 64 km northeast of Mamontovo (the district's administrative centre) by road. Korchino is the nearest rural locality.

References 

Rural localities in Mamontovsky District